The 2022–23 FA Cup qualifying rounds opened the 142nd edition of the FA Cup, the world's oldest association football single knockout competition, organised by The Football Association, the governing body for the sport in England. 640 teams in the 5th to 10th tier of English football competed across six rounds for 32 spots in the First Round Proper.

Eligibility
Applications to enter qualifying opened on 25 February 2022 and closed on 1 April 2022. The entry list, round exemptions and scheduling was confirmed on 1 July 2022. 640 teams from Level 5 to Level 9 of the English football league system (otherwise known as Steps 1 to 5 of the National League System) were eligible to compete.

In previous years Level 10 clubs were a prominent feature in the competition but since 2021–22 The FA has cut off their automatic eligibility. This was the result of the National League System being reformed to what the FA described as a "perfect 1–2–4–8–16 divisional model". A first phase was implemented in 2018/19 before a final stage saw over 100 clubs effectively promoted in 2021–22. This meant more teams now competed between Level 5 to 9 which consequently for the FA Cup saw Level 10 clubs dropped to a "subject to availability" basis instead. In the event that others do not enter, vacancies are filled by 10th tier applicants ranked by PPG in the previous league season.

For the 2022–23 edition, 11 vacancies were filled by 10th tier clubs; Abbey Hey, Andover New Street, Brixham, Folland Sports, Hinckley, Liskeard Athletic, New Mills, Newport (IOW), Radford, Warminster Town, and Wincanton Town.

Vacancies are created when eligible teams from Level 5 to 9 decide against entering or have their application rejected. For 2022–23, there were 11 such clubs:

Staines Town (9) did not appear on the entry list either before the club resigned from their league altogether on 4 July 2022. Hilltop were awarded a late promotion to fulfill the vacancy created. A Level 10 club when entry was announced three days prior, Hilltop were also without a FA Cup place before they were then accepted as a replacement to Jersey.

Amongst the 640 clubs entered into qualifying, nine were debutants; Buckhurst Hill, Bury AFC, Darlaston Town, Golcar United, Hilltop, Midhurst & Easebourne, Roffey, Shefford Town & Campton, and Worcester Raiders.

Format
The qualifying competition is a single-elimination tournament consisting of six rounds and 640 teams. 32 winners in the final round are awarded a place in the main competition beginning in November. Teams enter at different stages depending on their position in the English pyramid. All 9th and 10th tier teams begin in the opening, Extra-Preliminary Round and must win six matches to qualify. All 8th tier teams are ranked on last season's PPG, except newly promoted teams automatically ranked towards the bottom and newly relegated teams ranked towards the top; Then the 95 lowest ranked teams enter at the Extra-Preliminary Round and the 64 highest ranked teams enter at the preliminary round. Teams entering at the preliminary round must win five matches to qualify. All 7th tier teams enter at the 1st qualifying round and must win 4 matches to qualify. 6th tier teams enter at the 2nd qualifying round and must win three matches to qualify. 5th tier teams enter at the final, 4th qualifying round and must win one match to qualify.

Matches ending in a tie are replayed once and thereafter decided by extra-time and penalties if the scores remain level. Ties are played on a geographical basis, starting with 10 regionalised pots in the Extra-Preliminary and Preliminary Rounds, and gradually reducing further into the draw. Whilst the division of the English football league system correlates closer to club density, the FA Cup groups teams based more on travel distance. Therefore, pots can consist of an unequal number of teams.

Extra preliminary round
The extra preliminary and preliminary rounds were drawn on 8 July 2022. Teams were drawn into 10 regionalised groups loosely based on travel distance. More club-dense regions drew bigger pot sizes; One contained 86 teams loosely correlated to the Combined Counties North and South, the Southern Combination, and the Southern Counties East Level 9 Divisions. Regions with fewer clubs drew smaller pot sizes combining fewer divisions; One pot contained just 20 teams loosely correlating to the Western League Level 9 division.

416 teams entered at this round; 310 from Level 9 (plus ten Level 10 replacements) and the 95 lowest ranked clubs from Level 8 (plus a Level 10 replacement for Guernsey). A team at this stage must win six matches should it qualify as one of the 32 non-league clubs in the FA Cup proper; as many victories as it takes a Premier League or Championship side to win the whole competition.

Review 
The round featured a record 208 fixtures plus replays. Amongst them, Holyport won their first ever match in the competition in what was their 9th Extra–Preliminary appearance; Keynsham Town set a record for the most consecutive campaigns ending at this stage (with 12); and  Newhaven's 10–0 win over Canterbury City was the 8th highest margin of victory in replay history.

Newport (IOW) teenager, Finn Smith, became the youngest ever FA Cup goalscorer a day after his 16th birthday. Elsewhere, Moneyfields forward, Callum Laycock, scored all the goals in their 5–0 win over Bemerton Heath Harlequins.

Upsets

Notes

Preliminary round
The draw for the preliminary round was also made on 8 July 2022. The same 10 regionalised pots were used.

272 teams made an appearance; 64 newly entered from Level 8 and 208 winners from the previous round. Four teams in Level 10 were still standing; Andover New Street, Brixham, Newport (IOW), and Wincanton Town. Five debutants also remained in the competition; Buckhurst Hill, Bury AFC, Midhurst & Easebourne, Shefford Town & Campton, and Worcester Raiders.

Review 
136 fixtures plus replays took place. After taking nine attempts to win their first FA Cup game in the previous round, Holyport won their second at the first time of asking. All five debutants that made it through to this round also won again.

Notes

First qualifying round
The draw for the first qualifying round was made on 22 August 2022. Teams were drawn into 5 regionalised groups loosely based on the maximum distance travelled. More club dense regions drew bigger pot sizes combining more divisions; two pots contained 50 teams, another two contained 42, and one contained 40.

224 teams made an appearance; 88 newly entered from Level 7 and 136 winners from the previous round. The first of five teams from Wales, Merthyr Town, began at this stage. This round included one club from level 10, Wincanton Town, the lowest ranked team still standing. Five debutants also remained in the competition; Buckhurst Hill, Bury AFC, Midhurst & Easebourne, Shefford Town & Campton, and Worcester Raiders.

Review 
112 fixtures plus replays took place. Amongst the action, Bury AFC continued their debut FA Cup run with a 2–1 win over North Shields, live on BBC Sport; The lowest ranked and last remaining Level 10 team, Wincanton Town, saw their run end in a 9–2 defeat to AFC Totton; Blackfield & Langley goalkeeper, Connor Maseko, made national headlines by getting sent off for "urinating in a hedge"; Yan Osadchyi, a Ukrainian refugee who before the war played for second-tier club FC Alliance Lypova Dolyna, featured for Redditch United in their 4–1 away win at Rushall Olympic.

Upsets

Notes

Second qualifying round
The draw for the second qualifying round was made on 5 September 2022.

160 teams made an appearance; 48 newly entered from Level 6 (National League North and South) and 112 winners from the previous round.  This round included 16 clubs from Level 9, the lowest ranked teams still standing in the competition. Two debutants also remained in the competition, Bury AFC and Shefford Town & Campton.

Review 
A "rather surprising" number of cup shock occurred across this round.

Upsets

Notes

Third qualifying round
The draw for the third qualifying round was made on 20 September 2022.

80 winners from the previous round made an appearance, including seven teams from the 9th tier of English football, the lowest ranked teams still left in the competition. Two debutants also remained in the competition, Bury AFC and Shefford Town & Campton.

Upsets

Notes

Fourth qualifying round
The draw was made on 3 October 2022. Teams were drawn from two regionalised pots, with 14 fixtures in the northern section and 18 in the southern section.

64 teams made an appearance, 24 newly entering teams from Level 5 and 40 winners from the previous round. Three teams from the 9th tier of English football, the lowest ranked teams still left in the competition, competed in this round, including Bury AFC, the lone debutant remaining in the competition, but all three were knocked out.

Upsets

Notes

Broadcasting

Notes

References

External links
 The FA Cup

qualifying rounds
FA Cup qualifying rounds